DLT may refer to:

Businesses
 DLT (department store), Saint Petersburg, Russia
 DLT Solutions, a software reseller in Virginia, US

Music
 DLT (musician), New Zealand hip-hop DJ
 Dave Lee Travis (born 1945), British radio DJ
 De La Tierra, an international Latin American metal band

Science, technology and mathematics
 Digital Linear Tape, a computer storage magnetic tape format
 Direct linear transformation, an algorithm to solve systems of equations in projective geometry
 Distributed Language Translation
 Distributed ledger technology, a consensus of replicated, shared, and synchronized digital data spread across multiple sites
 International Conference on Developments in Language Theory, a computer science conference
 Dose limiting toxicity, in drug development; e.g. see Hydroxycarbamide

Other uses
 Boels–Dolmans Cycling Team (Union Cycliste Internationale abbreviation)
 Displaced left turn